L'Aleixar is a municipality in the comarca of Baix Camp, in the province of Tarragona, Catalonia, Spain.

The Serra de la Mussara, a subrange of the Prades Mountains rises north of the town. 
The church is dedicated to Saint Martin.

See also
Prades Mountains

References

Tomàs Bonell, Jordi; Descobrir Catalunya, poble a poble, Prensa Catalana, Barcelona, 1994

External links

L'Aleixar Town Hall webpage
 Government data pages 

Municipalities in Baix Camp
Populated places in Baix Camp